Jane Bussmann (born 1969 in Marylebone, London) is an English comedian and author, who has written for television and radio.  Her credits include: The Fast Show, Smack the Pony, Brass Eye, Jam, South Park and Crackanory; as well as the radio series Bussmann and Quantick Kingsize with David Quantick.

Bussmann also wrote and starred in "Bussmann's Holiday", a live one-woman show, directed by Sally Phillips, which played in Los Angeles, New York City and Edinburgh.  The show was based on Bussmann's experience of following conflict negotiator John Prendergast to Uganda, which she has since written about in her darkly comic memoir  The Worst Date Ever or How it Took a Comedy Writer to Expose Africa's Secret War, published in 2009.

Bussmann and Quantick also created The Junkies, the world's first internet sitcom.

Bibliography
 Once in a Lifetime: The Crazy Days of Acid House and Afterwards, 1998, Virgin Books 
 The Worst Date Ever: War Crimes, Hollywood Heart-Throbs and Other Abominations, 2009, Macmillan

References

External links
 
  on Twitter
 

1969 births
Living people
English women comedians
English women writers
People from Marylebone